The Gerdau is a  long, left (western) source river for the Ilmenau in the north German state of Lower Saxony.

The river rises in the eastern part of the Lüneburg Heath on the northeastern edge of the Südheide Nature Park. From its source, which is located in the Brambostel Moor Nature Reserve, north of the 94 m high Faßberg, the Gerdau flows by the villages of Eimke and Gerdau towards Uelzen. South of Uelzen it merges with the Stederau to form the Ilmenau.

Tributaries

See also
List of rivers of Lower Saxony

References 

Rivers of Lower Saxony
Lüneburg Heath
Rivers of Germany